Adullam() is an ancient ruin, once numbered among the thirty-six cities of Canaan whose kings "Joshua and the children of Israel smote" (Joshua 12:7-24). After that, it fell as an inheritance to the tribe of Judah and was included in the northern division of the lowland cities of the land of Judah (Joshua 15:35). 

The connection between Judah and Adullam and its surroundings was actually already established in the patriarchal period, when Judah "went down from his brothers and turned aside to a certain Adullamite, whose name was Hirah" (Genesis 38:1). At the beginning of the royal period, in the days of King Saul, the area was close to the land of the Philistines, and thus David, fleeing from Saul, sought refuge in the cave of Adullam and made it a place of reconnoitering and organization, both, for him and his men (1 Samuel 22:1-2). Here, too, the episode took place when three of David's heroes brought him water from the well of Bethlehem and he did not dare to drink it, but "poured it out unto the Lord" (2 Samuel 23:13-17). It is also learnt from the battle of David and Goliath which took place in the Elah valley, directly adjoining the north-side of the ruin, as well as from the raid of the Philistines into Keilah to the immediate south of Adullam, that Adullam was a frontier city during that period. 

The current site was formerly known by the Arabic appellation , 9 mi. (15 km.) northeast of Beit Gubrin, and was built upon a hilltop overlooking the Elah valley, straddling the Green Line between Israel and the West Bank, and with its suburban ruin,  (or ), lying directly below it. By the late 19th century, the settlement, which had been a town, was in ruins. The hilltop ruin is named after Madkour, one of the sons of the Sultan Beder, for whom is built a shrine (wely) and formerly called by its inhabitants . The hilltop is mostly flat, with cisterns carved into the rock. The remains of stone structures which once stood there can still be seen. Sedimentary layers of ruins from the old Canaanite and Israelite eras, mostly potsherds, are noticeable everywhere, although olive groves now grow atop of this hill, enclosed within stonewall enclosures. The villages of Aderet, Aviezer and Khirbet al-Deir are located nearby.

Main archaeological sites; identification
The name of this latter site is believed by historical geographers to be a corruption of the word "Adullam." The identification of the upper site with the biblical Adullam is still inconclusive, as archaeological evidence attesting to its Old Canaanite name has yet to be found. In the late 19th century, the hilltop ruin and its adjacent ruins were explored by French explorer, Victor Guérin, who wrote:

[Upon leaving the hilltop ruin, Khirbet el-Sheikh Madkour], at 11:20 [AM], we descend to the east in the valley. At 11:25 [AM], I examine other ruins, called Khirbet A'id el-Miah. Sixty toppled houses in the wadi formed a village that still existed in the Muslim period, as [proven by] the remains of a mosque there observed. In antiquity, the ruins that cover the plateau of the hill of Sheikh Madkour and which extend in the valley were probably one and the same city, divided into two parts, the upper part and the lower part.

The site is maintained by the Jewish National Fund in Israel, and where archaeological surveys and partial excavations have been conducted.

The site was first recognised as the biblical Adullam by French archaeologist Clermont-Ganneau in 1871, based on its location, a close approximation of the name and the ceramic finds it yielded. Razed stone structures, a stone water trough, and the shaft of a stone column can still be seen there. Palestine Exploration Fund surveyor, C.R. Conder, mentions having seen in  an ancient well having stone water-troughs round it.

Earlier attempts at identification have led some to call other cave systems by the name of "Cave of Adullam." Modern-day archaeologists have rejected these early hypotheses, and have accepted that  is the Adullam of old.

History

Late Bronze Age, Iron Age and Hebrew Bible 
The "Adullam" mentioned in the Hebrew Bible is thought to be identical with Tell Sheikh Madkhur. The so-called "Biblical period", for time reference-sake, has been referred to by historians and archaeologists as the Late Bronze Age and the Iron Age, meaning, the Late Canaanite and Israelite periods, respectively. A.F. Rainey recognized Adullam (Kh. esh-Sheikh Madhkûr) as a Late Bronze Age site.

Adullam is referred to in the Hebrew Bible as being one of the royal cities of the Canaanites, and is listed along with the cities Jarmuth and Socho as occupying a place in the region geographically known as the Shefelah, or what is a place of transition between the mountainous region and the coastal plains.

It was here that Judah, the son of Jacob (Israel), came when he left his father and brothers in Migdal Eder. Judah befriended a certain Hirah, an Adullamite. In Adullam, Judah met his first wife (unnamed in the Book of Genesis), the daughter of Shuah. 

During the period of the Israelite conquest of the land of Canaan, Adullam was one of many city-states with independent and sovereign kings. According to the same biblical source, the king of Adullam was slain by Joshua and the Israelites during their conquest of the land. The immediate lands were, by what was thought to be a "divine act" of casting lots, given as a tribal inheritance to the progeny of Judah. 

More than 400 years later, the scene of David's victory over Goliath in the Elah valley was within a short distance from Adullam, at that time a frontier village. Although David was elevated and allowed to sit in King Saul's presence, he soon fell into disrepute with the king and was forced to flee. 

David sought refuge in Adullam after being expelled from the city of Gath by King Achish. The Book of Samuel refers to the Cave of Adullam where he found protection while living as a refugee from King Saul. Certain caves, grottos and sepulchres are still to be seen on the hilltop, as well as on its northern and eastern slopes. It was there that "every one that was in distress gathered together, and every one that was in debt, and every one that was discontented." There, David thirsted for the well-waters of his native Beth-lehem, then occupied by a Philistine garrison. David sent a party of his mighty-men of valor to fetch for him water from that place, but, when they returned, David refused to drink it.

In the 10th-century BCE, Adullam was thought to have strategic importance, prompting King David's grandson, Rehoboam (c. 931–913 BCE), to fortify the town, among others, against Ancient Egypt. According to Israeli historian N.Naʾaman, this was not a fortress in the real sense, but only a town inhabited by a civilian population, although it functioned as an administrative military center in which a garrison was stationed and food and armor stored.

Assyrian and Chaldean conquests
In the late 8th-century BCE, the Book of Micah recalled the cities of the lowlands of Judah during a time of Assyrian encroachment in the country:

I will yet bring unto thee, O inhabitant of Mareshah, him that shall possess thee; he shall come even unto Adullam, O glory of Israel.

The Assyrian period was followed by the rise of the Chaldean Empire, a time marked by general unrest and the eventual deportation of the inhabitants of Judah by the Chaldean army in the 6th-century BCE. Adullam, as with other towns of the region, would not have gone unaffected.

Persian period
The only record of Adullam for this time-period (c. 539–331 BCE) is taken from the Hebrew canonical books, specifically the account of Nehemiah who returned with the Jewish exiles from the Babylonian captivity, during the reign of Artaxerxes I. According to Ezra, the acclaimed author of the book, some of these returnees had settled in Adullam, as shown by ancient historical records. According to Nehemiah, the postexilic community that resettled in Adullam traced their lineage to the tribe of Judah.

The political entity that was established in Judea at the time was that of a vassal state, as Judea became a province of the Persian Empire, governed by a satrap.

Hellenistic, Roman and Byzantine periods
Few records abound for the site during the classical period. In 163 BCE, it was in Adullam that Judas Maccabaeus, the principal leader of the Maccabean Revolt during a time of foreign dominion in the country, retired with his fighting men, after returning from war against the Idumaeans and the Seleucid general, Gorgias. Adullam stood near the highway which later became the Roman road in the Valley of Elah, which road led from Jerusalem to Beit Gubrin.

As late as the early 4th century CE, Adullam was described by Eusebius as being "a very large village about ten [Roman] miles east of Eleutheropolis."

Ottoman period
Adullam was an inhabited village in the late 16th-century. An Ottoman tax ledger of 1596 lists  in the nahiya Ḫalīl (Hebron subdistrict), and where it is noted that it had thirty-six Muslim heads of households. The copyist of the same tax ledger had erroneously mistaken the Arabic dal in the document for a nun, and which name has since been corrected by historical geographers Yoel Elitzur and Toledano to read , based on the entry's number of fiscal unit in the daftar and its corresponding place on Hütteroth's map.

According to Conder, an ancient road, leading from Beit Sur to Ashdod, once passed through ʿAīd el Mâ (Adullam) and was still partially visible.

French orientalist and archaeologist, Charles Clermont-Ganneau, visited the site in 1874 and wrote: "The place is absolutely uninhabited, except during the rainy season, when the herdsmen take shelter there for the night." 

The Arabs of Bayt Nattif in the 19th-century, when asked about the meaning of the name of the nearby ruin, related their own legend about the origin of the name. According to their version, the name  = lit. "Holiday of the Hundred," revolves around an event that occurred there, years ago. According to their story, a large fight broke out on a holiday, in which a hundred people were killed and the settlement destroyed. In memory of the event, the ruins of the settlement were named , which means "Holiday of the Hundred." Scholars explain this as a case of 'popular etymology', where, in Palestinian toponyms, the original denotation of a town's name is often "re-interpreted" by its local population.

Modern period 
In 1957, the establishment of the Adullam region began, a settlement area comprising over 100,000 dunams (25,000 acres), and bearing the name of the biblical city. Near the mound, north of it, Moshav Aderet was established in 1958.

Surveys were conducted on the site in the years 1992 and 1999. As late as 2003, the archaeological site of Adullam, both, Upper and Lower, had not been excavated, but by September of 2015, an excavation to a depth of 0.2 m in six squares of equal size was conducted in the surface of the Upper ruin, in hopes of determining the extent of the settlement at the site during the various periods from the relative distribution of the pottery. The gathered pottery sherds found in situ dated from the Early Bronze Age to the Ottoman period.

References

Bibliography

 (volume 2, 1938)
{{cite book |last=Aharoni|first=Y. |author-link=Yohanan Aharoni |title=The Land of the Bible: A Historical Geography|edition=2 |publisher=Westminster Press |location=Philadelphia|year=1979|language=en|isbn=0664242669 |oclc=6250553}} (original Hebrew edition: 'Land of Israel in Biblical Times - Historical Geography', Bialik Institute, Jerusalem (1962))
 

 

Clermont-Ganneau, C. (1875), The Site of the City of Adullam, Palestine Exploration Fund Quarterly Statement 7.3 (July), pp. 168–177
 

  

Encyclopaedia Judaica (1971). Vol. 2 (A–ANG), Keter Publishing House, Jerusalem 

 

 

 Further reading 
 Albright, W.F. (1924). Bulletin of the American Schools of Oriental Research, 15. pp. 3–ff.
 Dalman, Gustaf (1913). Palästinajahrbuch'', 9. pp. 33–ff. (in German)

External links

Survey of Western Palestine, Map 21:  IAA, Wikimedia commons
 ʿAdullam ancient city, Israel, Encyclopaedia Britannica

Archaeological sites in Israel
Nature reserves in Israel
Canaanite cities
Biblical geography
Ancient Israel and Judah
Former populated places in Israel
Ancient sites in Israel
Ancient Jewish settlements of Judaea
Mateh Yehuda Regional Council
Hebrew Bible cities
Tells (archaeology)
Kingdom of Judah
Valley of Elah

de:Liste geographischer und ethnographischer Bezeichnungen in der Bibel#A